Mehranjan-e Arameneh (also Romanized as Mehranjān-e Ārāmeneh) is a village in Oshtorjan Rural District, in the Central District of Falavarjan County, Isfahan Province, Iran. At the 2006 census, its population was 269, in 70 families.

References 

Populated places in Falavarjan County